The 1991 West Virginia Mountaineers football team represented West Virginia University in the 1991 NCAA Division I-A football season. It was the Mountaineers' 99th overall and 1st season as a member of the Big East Conference (Big East). The team was led by head coach Don Nehlen, in his 12th year, and played their home games at Mountaineer Field in Morgantown, West Virginia. They finished the season with a record of six wins and five losses (6–5 overall, 3–4 in the Big East).

Schedule

Roster

References

West Virginia
West Virginia Mountaineers football seasons
West Virginia Mountaineers football